Ellerbeck is a coastal locality in the Cassowary Coast Region, Queensland, Australia.

Geography

Climate
The climate of Ellerbek is classified as tropical monsoon climate (Köppen Am).

History 
The locality was named after the Ellerbeck railway station, which was in turn named on 18 February 1925 by the Queensland Railways Department.

The name for the parish has been documented since 1866. As for the locality, the name of the town of Ellerbeck near Osnabrück was probably the basis. Though, however, can be seen as a Germanic language name, Ellerbeck is therefore found in England or North Germany.

References 

Cassowary Coast Region
Localities in Queensland
Coastline of Queensland